Mahatma Gandhi Central University (MGCU), is a central university located in Motihari, Bihar, India. MGCU has 7 schools and 20 academic departments. This is the second Central University in Bihar after the Central University of South Bihar (CUSB).

History
The Central Universities (Amendment) Act, 2014 which received presidential assent on December 17, 2014, provided for the establishment of Mahatma Gandhi Central University having its territorial jurisdiction extending to the territory in the North of the River Ganges in the State of Bihar.

Organisation and administration

Governance
The university is governed by the rules set by the Central Universities Act, 2009.
The president of India is the visitor of the university. The chancellor is the ceremonial head of the university while the executive powers rest with the vice-chancellor. The court, the executive council, the academic council, the board of studies and the finance committee are the administrative authorities of the university.

Schools and departments
The university has 7 schools and 20 departments:

School of Commerce & Management Sciences
 Department of Commerce
 Department of Management Sciences
 School of Computational Sciences, Information and Communication Technology
 Department of Computer Science & Information Technology
 Department of  Library and Information Science
 Department of Media Studies
 School of Education
 Department of  Educational Studies
 School of Humanities & Languages
Department of  English
Department of Hindi
Department of Sanskrit
 School of Life Sciences
 Department of Biotech and Genome
Department of Botany
Department of Zoology
 School of Physical Sciences
Department of Chemistry
 Department of Mathematics
Department of Physics
 School of Social Sciences
 Department of Economics
 Department of  Gandhian and Peace Studies
 Department of Political Science
 Department of Social Work
 Department of Sociology

Academic profile

Admission
The university admits students to various UG, PG, and PhD programmes through the Entrance exam conducted by the university itself. Entrance Exam held annually on various exam centres across India.

Library
Atal Bihari Vajpayee Central Library (a learning resource centre) of Mahatma Gandhi Central University was established in the year 2016. The university library has more than 26000+ books, 13 magazines, 11 newspapers and 125+ donated book which providing access to scholarly information, research support and study facilities to the teaching and non-teaching staff, students and research scholars.

Activism and controversy
In 2017, the university terminated two assistant professors without citing any prior notice, which caused heavy protest by the students of university. In June 2018, students of the university launched heavy protest after the university increased fees. Later that month, faculty members sat on hunger strike after the university issued a show cause notice to a professor.

In August 2018, Sanjay kumar, an assistant professor of the university, was attacked for criticising Prime Minister Atal Bihari Vajpayee in a Facebook post. This led to the closure of the university for a 15-day period.

In October 2018, the vice-chancellor of the university, Arvind Kumar Agrawal, was accused of some anomalies in his educational qualifications. This led to his resignation a week later, and the appointment of the pro-chancellor Anil Kumar Rai for the position.

References

External links
 

Central universities in India
Universities in Bihar
East Champaran district
Educational institutions established in 2016
2016 establishments in Bihar